Hawkwind 1997 is a 1999 live album by the English space rock group Hawkwind.

It was recorded at various shows during the group's 1997 tour to promote the Distant Horizons album.

Track listing
"Wheels (Your World)" (Richard Chadwick, Jerry Richards) – The Garage, Glasgow, 19 October
"Phetamine Street" (Ron Tree) – The Irish Centre, Leeds, 27 October
"Your Fantasy" (Captain Rizz, Tree, Dave Brock, Chadwick, Richards) – University of East Anglia, Norwich, 8 October
"Alchemy" (Chadwick, Richards) – The Centre, Newport, 6 November
"Love in Space" (Brock) – The Centre, Newport, 6 November
"Aerospaceage Inferno" (Robert Calvert) – The Empire, Liverpool, 23 October
"Sonic Attack" (Michael Moorcock) – The Empire, Liverpool, 23 October
"Blue Skin" (Tree, Brock) – Charter Hall, Colchester, 10 October
"Brainstorm" (Nik Turner) / "Hawkwind in Your Area" (Rizz/Brock) – The Empire, Liverpool, 23 October
"Reptoid Vision" (Tree) – The Empire, Liverpool, 23 October
"Ejection" (Calvert) – Festival Theatre, Paignton, 5 November
"The Gremlin (part 2)" (Calvert) – Festival Theatre, Paignton, 5 November

Personnel 
Hawkwind
Captain Rizz – vocals
Dave Brock – electric guitar, keyboards, vocals
Jerry Richards – electric guitar
Ron Tree – vocals, bass guitar
Richard Chadwick – drums
Technical
Cover by Bob Walker
Compiled by Jerry Richards

Release history
January 1999: Voiceprint Records, HAWKVP999, CD - limited edition sold at gigs and through the Hawkwind website.

References

Hawkwind live albums
1999 live albums